HMS Dragon is the fourth ship of the Type 45 or Daring-class air-defence destroyers built for the Royal Navy. She was launched in November 2008 and commissioned on 20 April 2012.

Construction
Dragons construction began at the then BAE Systems Naval Ships (later BAE Systems Surface Fleet Solutions) yard at Scotstoun on the River Clyde in December 2005, and by December 2007 the bow section was in place on the Govan slipway for mating with the other modules. Dragon launched from the slipway at Govan on 17 November 2008 at 3:00pm. Her sponsor was Mrs Susie Boissier, wife of Vice Admiral Paul Boissier, Deputy Commander-in-Chief Fleet and Chief of Staff. She was fitted out at Scotstoun.

Sea trials
Dragon commenced her first set of contractor's sea trials on 5 November 2010.

Dragon entered her home port of Portsmouth for the first time on 31 August 2011.

Operational service

Dragon joined the Royal Navy Surface Fleet on Friday, 20 April 2012. On Friday 27 April, she made her maiden visit to Liverpool, staying for three days. She opened to the public on Saturday 28 April, with visitors able to see the inside of the ship, including the operations room.

In August 2013, it was reported Dragon was sailing with the  carrier group in the Arabian Sea, acting as the main point ship for aircraft control. In August 2013, several Typhoons from No. 6 Squadron RAF were exercising with Dragon and US fighters in the Persian Gulf. It sailed westward to the Eastern Mediterranean.

In April 2014, Dragon was deployed to waters north of Scotland, after sailing from Portsmouth to track the Russian warship . She was part of the Royal Navy's Atlantic Patrol Tasking in late 2014, visiting places such as the South Georgia Islands, the Falkland Islands, and a transit through the Panama Canal.

October 2016, Dragon tracked two Russian corvettes in the Atlantic Ocean and Bay of Biscay during a major deployment of Russian naval forces near the United Kingdom.

Clyde Challenger was subsequently scuttled.

A 26 November 2018 press-release claimed Dragon discovered a suspicious boat while on operation in the Middle East. Sailors and Royal Marines boarded the vessel, and found 148 bags containing 3,048kg of hashish.

15 March 2019, Dragon made its seventh drug seizure: 224kg of heroin from a fishing vessel in the Arabian Sea. During her time in the Arabian Sea, Dragon made eight drug busts and seized over eighteen tons of narcotics, a record for the number of successful busts and the total weight of drugs seized by a Royal Navy ship in the Middle East.

As of March 2019,  took over the current patrol role in the Middle East. 
HMS Montrose replaced Dragon in the Persian gulf in March 2019.

Characteristics

Dragon features a red Welsh Dragon on each side of her bow, the only Royal Navy ship to be adorned in this way. The dragons were there when she was launched, but were removed in a 2011 refit.  They were restored in 2016 following a fundraising campaign led by the British Warships Association.

Affiliations
Cardiff, Wales
York, England
The Royal Thames Yacht Club
The Worshipful Company of Plaisterers
The Welsh Livery Guild
Royal Navy recognised Sea Scout Groups of http://www.tir-a-mor-scouts.org.uk which are 1st Barry Sea Scouts, 5th Barry Sea Scouts and 6th Barry Sea Scouts RN97 
South Wales District Sea Cadets
The Dragon School

In popular culture
Dragon appeared in No Time to Die, the 25th film of the James Bond series. The film inaccurately depicts the Type 45’s Aster Surface-to-Air missiles as land attack missiles. Shooting for Dragon’s role in the film’s finale took place off the Faroe Islands in September of 2019.

Notes

References

External links 

 

 

Type 45 destroyers
Ships built on the River Clyde
2008 ships
Destroyers of the United Kingdom